The 1905 Southern Intercollegiate Athletic Association football season was the college football games played by the member schools of the Southern Intercollegiate Athletic Association as part of the 1905 college football season. The season began on September 30.

One publication claims "The first scouting done in the South was in 1905, when Dan McGugin and Captain Innis Brown, of Vanderbilt went to Atlanta to see Sewanee play Georgia Tech."

Season overview

Results and team statistics

Key

PPG = Average of points scored per game
PAG = Average of points allowed per game

Regular season

SIAA teams in bold.

Week One

Week Two

Week Three

Week Four

Week Five

Week Six

Week Seven

Week Eight

Week Nine

Week Ten

Week Eleven

All-Southern team

The composite All-Southern  eleven representing the consensus of newspapers as published in Fuzzy Woodruff's A History of Southern Football 1890-1928 included:

References